André Raynauld, OC (October 20, 1927 – April 11, 2011) was a Canadian politician, who represented the electoral district of Outremont in the National Assembly of Quebec from 1976 to 1980. He was a member of the Quebec Liberal Party.

Prior to his election, he was an economics professor at the Université de Montréal.

References

1927 births
2011 deaths
Quebec Liberal Party MNAs
People from Bas-Saint-Laurent
Officers of the Order of Canada